The Oxfordshire Ironstone Railway was a standard-gauge mineral railway that served an ironstone quarry near the village of Wroxton in Oxfordshire.

The line's history
The line was opened between 1917 and 1919 and closed in 1967; the line was 'lifted', that is the line was formally closed and physically removed from the site, between 1967 and 1968. The quarry was heavily worked in the Second World War. The line also served the Banbury Alcan works at one point. The popular footpath from Drayton to Drayton Lodge crossed the railway at Drayton Crossing.

Wroxton Central Ironstone Quarry was opened by 1919, closed and filled in 1967. Langley Ironstone Quarry was built near Balscot by 1926, and was closed and filled during 1943 when it ran out of ironstone. Dyke Lane Bridge was built in 1940 and abandoned in 1967.

The line was extended to the Balscote Quarry which was worked between 1956 and its closure in 1967. Balscote Quarry, a shorter-lived working, was built by 1956, but closed and filled in 1967. A newer quarry close by its former site is now served by road haulage only.

The mine buildings, manager's house and workers' halt are now a small set of new light industrial buildings, built circa 2006–2008. The track works' permanent way huts (p-huts) still stood at Drayton in 2007 and Horley in 2002. A few old OIR fence posts/gates remain to this day along the route. Banbury's Ruscote and Hardwick estate's (Daimler Avenue, Devon Way and Longelandes Way) are also built over a large part of its route, including most of the former Pen Hill farm grading works (Longelandes Way). Other built over places include the proposed minor Pin Hill maintenance depot (Pin Hill Road) and major active Pen Hill maintenance depot (Beaumont Road). Despite the development that has occurred north of Banbury since closure, much of the line of the route can be walked today.

Locomotive fleet
The OIR operated its own fleet of steam locomotives: 0-6-0T and 0-6-0ST locomotives built by Hunslet, Hudswell Clarke, Peckett & Sons and 0-4-0ST's built by Hudswell Clarke, Hunslet, W. G. Bagnall and Peckett & Sons. There was also a Vertical Boilered loco supplied by Sentinel. The earliest locos carried names associated with Oxford University eg "The President" and "The Dean". Later locos carried boys and girls names, typically the 0-6-0 locos being male eg "Graham", "Frank" etc. while the smaller 0-4-0 locos otherwise eg "Betty", "Jean" etc.  They also purchased thirteen Rolls-Royce Sentinel diesel-hydraulic locomotives fitted with Rolls-Royce C range engines in the 1960s. Several of these Sentinel locomotives are still in existence, with the largest collection (named "Betty", "Jean" and "Graham") at Rocks By Rail Museum. A single locomotive is also preserved nearby at the Nene Valley Railway ("Barabel"), and a further example at the East Somerset ("Joan").  All five locos above are in restored and operational condition.

Local geology
Many heavy clay and Ironstone deposits surround Banbury and Wroxton.

The Edge Hill Light Railway connection
The firm behind the Oxfordshire Ironstone Railway was one of the backers of the ill-fated 1920–1922 Edge Hill Light Railway.

There was talk of reopening the by then overgrown, but workable line early in to World War II but, it was decided that the Oxfordshire Ironstone line was to be considered adequate to serve the area's requirements.

See also
History of Banbury
Clay pit
Coal mine
Chalk pit
Mineral railway

References

External links
Photo gallery of the disused railway
Apollo Business Parks LLP

Books

Historic imagery of the site

Railway lines opened in 1917
Rail transport in Oxfordshire
Closed railway lines in South East England
Cherwell District